Tunca may refer to:

 Tunca (river), or Tundzha, a river in Bulgaria and Turkey
 Tunca, Ardeşen, a town in the districts of Ardeşen, Rize Province, Turkey
 , a neighbourhood in Şehzadeler, Manisa Province, Turkey

See also 
 Birand Tunca, Turkish actor
 Tunca Bridge, a bridge in Edirne, Turkey
 Tunka (disambiguation)
 Tunja (disambiguation)